Jens Baxmann (born 24 March 1985) is a German former professional ice hockey defenceman who played in the Deutsche Eishockey Liga (DEL). Baxmann spent the majority of his professional career, playing as a stalwart on the blueline with Eisbären Berlin before spending two seasons with the Iserlohn Roosters.

On April 2, 2019, having concluded his 16th season with Eisbären Berlin in 2018–19, Baxmann left the club as a free agent, opting to continue his career in agreeing to a two-year contract with fellow German club, the Iserlohn Roosters.

Baxmann has also played internationally for the German national team.

References

External links
 

1985 births
Living people
Eisbären Berlin players
German ice hockey defencemen
Iserlohn Roosters players
Lausitzer Füchse players
People from Wernigerode
Sportspeople from Saxony-Anhalt